WQZX (94.3 FM, "Q94") is a radio station broadcasting a country music format. Licensed to Greenville, Alabama, United States.  The station is currently owned by Haynes Broadcasting, Inc. and features programming from ABC Radio.

References

External links

QZX
Country radio stations in the United States
Greenville, Alabama
Radio stations established in 1984
1984 establishments in Alabama